William Blackburn Cahill (born May 5, 1951) is an American former professional football player who played two seasons in the National Football League with the Buffalo Bills. He appeared in 19 games, from 1973 to 1974, mostly on 

Born and raised in Bellevue, Washington, a suburb east of Seattle, Cahill graduated from Bellevue High School in 1969 and played college football at the University of Washington in Seattle under head coach  In his senior season in 1972, he was co-captain with quarterback  and he was selected in the seventh round of the 1973 NFL Draft by the New Orleans Saints.

After football, Cahill worked in production management for Boeing in the Seattle area.

References

External links
 

Living people
1951 births
Buffalo Bills players
Washington Huskies football players
American football defensive backs
Seattle University alumni
Sportspeople from Bellevue, Washington
Players of American football from Washington (state)